Niederfinow is a municipality in the district of Barnim in Brandenburg in Germany.

Demography

References

External links

Localities in Barnim